A newsagent's shop or simply newsagent's or paper shop (British English), newsagency (Australian English) or newsstand (American and Canadian English) is a business that sells newspapers, magazines, cigarettes, snacks and often items of local interest.  In Great Britain, Ireland and Australia, these businesses are termed newsagents (or newsagency in Australia). Newsagents typically operate in busy public places like city streets, railway stations and airports. Racks for newspapers and magazines can also be found in convenience stores, bookstores and supermarkets. The physical establishment can be either freestanding or part of a larger structure (e.g. a shopping mall or a railway station).

In Canada and the United States, newsstands are often open stalls in public locations such as streets, or in a transit terminal or station (subway, rail, or airport).

By country

Brazil
In Brazil, newsagents' shops are known as "bancas de jornal" or "bancas de revistas" and are usually family-owned, free-standing kiosks that only deal in periodical publications, telephone cards, bus tickets and the occasional book and cut-price DVD.
In suburban areas and villages they are normally housed in a shop selling stationery, tobacco and sweets as well as periodicals.

Australia

A newsagent is the manager of the newspaper department of the shop, often also the owner of a newsagency shop.

Newsagencies conduct either a retail business and/or a distribution business.

When they first appeared in Australia is unknown; the earliest reference known in Australia is an advertisement in 1855 in Melbourne.

The number of newsagencies in Australia are falling in recent years and this decline is expected to continue. In 2000, there was estimated about 5,000, by 2007/8 there were 4,635 newsagencies, by 2016/7 there are 3,150 newsagencies and in 2021/22 there are expected to be 2,856 newsagencies.

Retail newsagencies
Retail newsagencies primarily offer a comprehensive range of newspapers and magazines, as well as stationery and greeting cards.

Distribution newsagencies
Distribution newsagencies offer home delivery of a comprehensive range of newspapers and magazines, These can be quite large and sophisticated businesses. If authorised, they are often fully computerized. They often have a territory, which is partly protected by contracts with most of the Australian Newsagents' Federation recognised publishers/distributors. These recognised publishers/distributors include ACP Publishing, News Limited, Fairfax Publications, Rural Press, The West Australian and Australian Provincial Newspapers. These monopolies have been a major source of contention between newsagents and the Australian Consumer Affairs.

Italy
In Italy, newsagents' shops are known as edicola and are usually family-owned, free-standing kiosks that only deal in periodical publications, stickers, bus tickets and the occasional book and cut-price DVD.
In suburban areas and villages they are normally housed in a shop selling stationery, tobacco and sweets as well as periodicals.

Japan

In Japan, newsagents' shops are called kiosks, and are typically found in or around railway or subway stations. In addition to newspapers and magazines, they sell beverages, snack foods, postage stamps, cigarettes, and many other kinds of merchandise. Ekiben boxed lunches can be purchased at larger kiosks in inter-city rail stations.

United Kingdom

In the United Kingdom, newsagents' shops are small shops selling newspapers as well as magazines, sweets and tobacco; some of them also sell provisions and alcoholic beverages. Opening times vary according to the owners' preferences.

Many shops are family-owned. These family-owned shops may carry purchasing group or wholesaler group branding such as SPAR, Today's, "Local Shop" or NISA.  Alternatively the private owner choosing to do his own purchasing (usually from cash and carries) may carry advertising for a local paper, national news group or soft drink brand externally.  Prior to the banning of advertising of tobacco products, this was the most common form of external advertising.  The primary employers association aimed towards looking after the interests of independent newsagents in the UK and Republic of Ireland is the National Federation of Retail Newsagents.

Others are part of national chains such as RS McColl/Martins, Co-operative Group and WHSmith.  Mini-marts, off-licences and supermarkets may also act as newsagents.

Greece
In Greece, newsagents' shops are called periptera (singular: periptero) and they sell newspapers and magazines, but also other goods like beverages (including alcoholic ones), snacks, tobacco; and other kinds of merchandise. Opening times vary. They are typically found on the side of the road in crowded public areas.

United States

On street corners in New York City, for instance, newsstands are often shacks constructed of steel beams and aluminium siding or roofing tin; and require a city permit to build and operate. Other New York newsstands are located inside airports, hotels and office buildings – and even beneath street level in underground concourses or on subway platforms. Hudson News, a newsstand brand created in New York City, is operated by retailer the Hudson Group, with more than 500 stores around the world. This brand was created in 1987, and became more popular in the 1990s, during a time when newsstands in commuter terminals were being re-evaluated and reopened to better serve customers and the spaces with the most commuter foot traffic. Prior to this, newsstands caused limited visibility for police officers patrolling the subway stations, as well as impeding crowd movement.

References

External links

 "Yesterday's News", The New York Times article

Retailers by type of merchandise sold
Newspaper distribution